Sanandaj Jewish Neo-Aramaic is a variety of Northeastern Neo-Aramaic originally spoken by Jews in the city of Sanandaj, Iran. It is much more closely related to other Trans-Zab Jewish Neo-Aramaic dialects than the Neo-Aramaic dialect spoken by Christians in the same town.

Phonology

The historically pharyngealized consonants /ṭ/ and /ṣ/ in the current language have merged with /t/ and /s/ in many environments but sometimes affect the pronunciation of surrounding vowels. /lˤ/ and /rˤ/ are consistently pharyngealized.

References

Sources

Neo-Aramaic languages
Languages of Iran